St Mary's CBS (also known as Tralee CBS or, more usually, "The Green") is a Christian Brothers secondary school in Tralee, County Kerry, Ireland. The school had 620  students on roll.

Sport
In 2007 the school won the Munster Colleges Senior Gaelic football "A" (Corn Uí Mhuirí) title and went on only to lose to Omagh CBS in the All-Ireland Hogan Cup final.

Tralee CBS has produced more All Ireland Football medal winners than any other school in Ireland.

Notable former pupils
Kieran Donaghy, gaelic footballer
Martin Ferris, politician
Ultan Dillane, professional rugby player

References

External links
 Official school site

Buildings and structures in Tralee
Congregation of Christian Brothers secondary schools in the Republic of Ireland
Education in Tralee
Secondary schools in County Kerry
1927 establishments in Ireland
Educational institutions established in 1927